is a children's park in Minato Ward Mita 4-16-20 in Tokyo in Japan. A literal translation of its name is “turtle tomb park”. It lies on the Tsuki no Misaki plateau. A Japanese temple, Saikai-ji, is next to the park.

Gallery

External links 

Parks and gardens in Tokyo
Minato, Tokyo